Byland may refer to:

 A Peninsula or byland (also biland)
Byland Abbey, a small village and ruined abbey in North Yorkshire
Battle of Old Byland